František Vladislav Hek (11 April 1769 in Dobruška, Bohemia – 4 September 1847 in Kyšperk) was a Czech writer, composer, and patriot active in the early phases of the Czech National Revival. He was a major inspiration behind the fictionalized novel F. L. Věk (1906) by Alois Jirásek.

Biography
Hek was the son of a shopkeeper (of Dutch origin) from Dobruška. He received his primary education in Dobruška and in Prague (from 1779) and from 1782 he studied at a Piarists gymnasium in Prague. In Prague, Hek met the Czech patriots concentrated around Václav Matěj Kramerius' publishing house Česká expedice and around the Czech theatre groups. In the second half of the 1780s, he returned to Dobruška to take over his father's shop. Hek also served as a local agent for Kramerius, loaned books from his large personal library (3,284 volumes in 1806) and tried to organize a local Czech theatre, which was forbidden by authorities. A fire in 1806 completely destroyed his shop and he lost money during the state bankruptcy of the Austrian Empire in 1811. From 1806, he cooperated with Josef Liboslav Ziegler (1782–1846), a patriotic priest. In 1821, his wife died and he retired. Hek then lived, among other places, in the Saxonian town of Herrnhut, a center of Czech Evangelical exile, and for the last years of his life in Kyšperk (today Letohrad) with his daughter.

The historical novel F.L. Věk by Alois Jirásek is based on Hek's life, as described in his autobiography. A television series, F.L. Věk, was shot in 1971. The City Museum of Dobruška owns Hek's birth house, and has hosted an exhibition about Hek in the building since 1972. Dobruška's main square was named after F.L. Věk.

Work
The majority of the Hek's works were published after 1806; the 1820s were his most active period. The most important were his satirical epigrams. In 1820, he published book of epigrams Velký pátek, a scathing critique of provincialism in Dobruška. An example of his epigrams is: "The greater the fool, the more titles he needs". Predictably, the work was banned and confiscated, and only two original copies are known today. Hek was sentenced to three weeks in prison, though he was pardoned due to bad health, and was harassed by authorities in Dobruška ever thereafter. While living in Ochranov (Herrnhut), he translated old texts of Czech exiles into German. His best known music works were composed during the 1830–40s. Hek also wrote his own autobiography in German.

Literature
 Jan Jakubec: Dějiny literatury české (History of Czech Literature), volume I 1929, volume II 1934.
 Alois Jirásek: F.L. Věk
 Ladislav Hladký (director of the museum in Dobruška): F. Vl. Hek (F. L. Věk), 1972.

External links
 Museum in Dobruška: short information about Hek, photo (in Czech, scroll down)
 Short biography (in Czech)

1769 births
1847 deaths
People from Dobruška
Czech male writers
Czech language activists